Jennifer Ann Ogden  is a New Zealand clinical neuropsychologist, and was an associate professor in the Department of Psychology, University of Auckland. She is a fiction and non-fiction author, and has been a Fellow of the Royal Society Te Apārangi since 1999.

Early life and education 
Ogden was born in Ashburton, and studied to be a vet at Massey University before switching to neuroscience.

Career 
Ogden has a PhD from the University of Auckland completed in 1983, titled Out of mind, out of sight: unilateral spatial disorders in brain-damaged patients.

Ogden had a one-year fellowship at the Massachusetts Institute of Technology, where she became one of a small number of neuroscientists granted access to famous amnesiac Henry Molaison. Molaison had lost all memory during an operation to control epileptic seizures. Ogden ran the postgraduate clinical psychology programme at the University of Auckland, where she was an Associate Professor in the Department of Psychology. Later she retired to Great Barrier Island to write.

Ogden wrote a textbook about brain disorders, Fractured Minds: A Case-Study Approach to Clinical Neuropsychology, which is used in undergraduate and postgraduate teaching and is in second edition. She also wrote a neuropsychology book aimed at the general reader, Trouble in Mind, about 14 patients, including Molaison. Her book included the only known photo of Molaison, which was taken against MIT guidelines.

Fiction writing 
Ogden has written three works on fiction on neurological themes. Her first novel, A Drop in the Ocean, which was published in 2016, featuring a neurologist who loses research funding. The book won several awards, including the Gold Nautilus Book Award for Fiction, the Gold Sarton Women's Book Award for Contemporary Fiction, a Gold Award in the Independent Publisher Book Awards for Best Fiction, Australia and NZ, and a Silver Award in the Readers' Favorite International Book Awards for Women's Fiction awards. Her second novel, The Moon is Missing, was published in September 2020.

Awards and honours 
Ogden was awarded the Distinguished Career Award by the International Neuropsychological Society in 2015. Ogden was elected as a Fellow of the Royal Society Te Apārangi in 1999.

Selected publications

References 

Fellows of the Royal Society of New Zealand
New Zealand neuroscientists
New Zealand writers
Academic staff of the University of Auckland
Neuropsychologists
People from Ashburton, New Zealand
Massey University alumni
New Zealand women scientists
New Zealand women academics
New Zealand women novelists
Year of birth missing (living people)
Living people